Thomas Style may refer to:

 Sir Thomas Style, 2nd Baronet (1624–1702), Member of Parliament (MP) for Kent
 Sir Thomas Style, 4th Baronet (died 1769), MP for Bramber
 Sir Thomas Style, 7th Baronet (died 1813), see Style Baronets
 Sir Thomas Style, 8th Baronet (1797–1879), British MP for Scarborough

See also
 Thomas Stiles or Styles (fl. 1642–1662), a captain in the Royalist army during the English Civil War